This articles lists events from the year 2020 in Oman.

Incumbents
Sultan/Prime Minister: Qaboos bin Said al Said (until 10 January) Haitham bin Tariq Al Said (from 11 January)

Events

Deat of death 
 10 January – Qaboos bin Said al Said, sultan and ruler (b. 1940).

References

 
2010s in Oman
Years of the 21st century in Oman
Oman
Oman